The 2019 European Weightlifting Championships was held in Batumi, Georgia from 6 to 13 April 2019.

Medal overview

Men

Women

Medal table
Ranking by Big (Total result) medals

Ranking by all medals: Big (Total result) and Small (Snatch and Clean & Jerk)

Men's results

Men's 55 kg

Men's 61 kg

Men's 67 kg

Men's 73 kg

Men's 81 kg

Men's 89 kg

Women's results

References

External links
IWF Results 
Results book 

European Weightlifting Championships
2019 in weightlifting
2019 in Georgian sport
Sport in Batumi
Weightlifting in Georgia (country)
International sports competitions hosted by Georgia (country)
European Weightlifting Championships